The 2017–18 Denver Pioneers men's basketball team represented the University of Denver during the 2017–18 NCAA Division I men's basketball season. The Pioneers, led by second-year head coach Rodney Billups, played their home games at Magness Arena, with one home game at Hamilton Gymnasium, and are members of The Summit League. They finished the season 15–15, 8–6 in Summit League play to finish in third place. In the Summit League tournament, they defeated Oral Roberts in the quarterfinals before losing to South Dakota State in the semifinals.

Previous season
The Pioneers finished the season 16–14, 8–8 in Summit League play to finish in a three-way tie for fourth place. They lost in the quarterfinals of the Summit League tournament to South Dakota State.

Preseason 
In a poll of league coaches, media, and sports information directors, the Pioneers were picked to finish in fifth place. Senior center Daniel Amigo was named to the preseason All-Summit First Team and senior guard Joe Rosga was named to the Second Team.

Roster

Schedule and results
 
|-
!colspan=9 style=| Non-conference regular season

|-
!colspan=9 style=| The Summit League regular season

|-
!colspan=9 style=| The Summit League tournament

Source

References

Denver Pioneers men's basketball seasons
Denver
Denver Pioneers
Denver Pioneers